Jach'a Jaqhi (Aymara jach'a big, jaqhi precipice, cliff, "big cliff", also spelled Jacha Jakhe, Jachcha Jakke) is a  mountain in the Andes of Bolivia. It is located in the Oruro Department, San Pedro de Totora Province.

References 

Mountains of Oruro Department